Émile Hamilius (16 May 1897 – 7 March 1971) was a Luxembourgish politician for the Democratic Party.  He was the Mayor of Luxembourg City from 1946 until 1963, and also sat three stints in the Chamber of Deputies (1937–40, 1945–58, 1959–64).  Hamilius was the second President of the Council of European Municipalities and Regions, from 1953 until 1959.

In earlier life, Hamilius played football for the Luxembourg national team, including at the 1920 Summer Olympics in Antwerp. He then combined his roles as an ex-footballer with that as a politician by serving as President of the Luxembourg Football Federation between 1950 and 1961.

Luxembourg City's Place Émile Hamilius, situated just off Boulevard Royal in Ville Haute, is named after Hamilius.  He also gave his name to the now-defunct Centre Émile Hamilius, which was the location of much of Luxembourg City's municipal administration until 2012.

His son, Jean, is a former DP politician himself, serving as a Deputy, minister, and Member of the European Parliament.  He also competed at the Summer Olympics (in 1952), like Émile Hamilius.

References

|-

Mayors of Luxembourg City
Members of the Chamber of Deputies (Luxembourg)
Democratic Party (Luxembourg) politicians
Luxembourgian footballers
Olympic footballers of Luxembourg
Footballers at the 1920 Summer Olympics
1897 births
1971 deaths
People from Esch-sur-Alzette
Knights Commander of the Order of Merit of the Federal Republic of Germany
Association football defenders
Luxembourg international footballers